We Are Volsung is the sixth full-length studio release by Zodiac Mindwarp and The Love Reaction. It was recorded at The Lodge Recording Studio, Northampton, England, and was engineered by Max Read. The album is loosely based on Norse mythology and references Völsung. Cover photograph by Photographer William 'Bill' Corbett.

Track listing
 "Stark von Oben" (4:01)
 "We Are Volsung" (4:17)
 "We Ride" (3:20)
 "Tree Rider" (2:33)
 "White Trash" (2:39)
 "Don't Touch My Guitar" (2:52)
 "Lucille" (2:13)
 "Die Pretty" (2:58)
 "Key to Your Heart" (2:38)
 "Kill a Mockingbird" (4:05)

Personnel
 Zodiac Mindwarp (Mark Manning) – vocals
 Cobalt Stargazer (Geoff Bird) – guitars
 Jack Shitt – bass
 Bruno "The Cat" Agua – drums

References

2010 albums
Zodiac Mindwarp and the Love Reaction albums